Perittia metaxea is a moth of the family Elachistidae. It is found in Texas, United States.

The length of the forewings is about 5 mm. The ground color of the forewings is silky white, with scattered scales with a light brown tip, forming an irregular spot and line. The hindwings are slightly translucent gray.

References

Moths described in 1995
Elachistidae
Moths of North America